Covilhã Airport  was an airport serving Covilhã, Portugal. The airport was demolished to give place to one of the Portugal Telecom's Data Center.

See also

List of airports in Portugal

References

Airports in Portugal
Defunct airports
Buildings and structures in Castelo Branco District